Wooden horse may refer to:

The Wooden Horse, a 1950 British World War II prisoner of war film
The Wooden Horse, a 1909 novel by Hugh Walpole
Wooden horse (device), a torture device
Hobby horse, a children's toy
Trojan Horse, the wooden horse of Troy
Vault (gymnastics), a piece of equipment used for vaulting in gymnastics